Sebastian Biederlack (born 16 September 1981 in Hamburg) is a field hockey player from Germany, who was a member of the Men's National Team that won the bronze medal at the 2004 Summer Olympics in Athens, Greece. 

The midfielder who played for German club Club an der Alster and Spanish club Club de Campo made his international senior debut for the national team on 10 July 1999 in a friendly against South Korea in Leipzig. As of 12 December 2005, Biederlack earned 139 caps for his native country, in which he scored eleven goals.

He represented his native country at the 2008 Summer Olympics in Beijing, China.

International senior tournaments
 2001 – Champions Trophy, Rotterdam (1st place)
 2002 – 10th World Cup, Kuala Lumpur (1st place)
 2002 – Champions Trophy, Cologne (2nd place)
 2003 – European Indoor Nations Cup, Santander (1st place)
 2003 – Champions Trophy, Amstelveen (6th place)
 2003 – European Nations Cup, Barcelona (1st place)
 2004 – Summer Olympics, Athens (3rd place)
 2005 – European Nations Cup, Leipzig (3rd place)
 2005 – Champions Trophy, Chennai (4th place)
 2006 – Champions Trophy, Terrassa (2nd place)
 2006 – 11th World Cup, Mönchengladbach (1st place)
 2007 – European Nations Cup, Manchester (4th place)
 2007 – Champions Trophy, Kuala Lumpur (1st place)

References

External links
 

1981 births
Living people
German male field hockey players
Male field hockey midfielders
Olympic field hockey players of Germany
2002 Men's Hockey World Cup players
Field hockey players at the 2004 Summer Olympics
2006 Men's Hockey World Cup players
Field hockey players at the 2008 Summer Olympics
Olympic gold medalists for Germany
Olympic bronze medalists for Germany
Field hockey players from Hamburg
Olympic medalists in field hockey
Medalists at the 2008 Summer Olympics
Medalists at the 2004 Summer Olympics
Der Club an der Alster players
Club de Campo Villa de Madrid players
German expatriate sportspeople in Spain
Expatriate field hockey players